Dhiraj Choudhury (September 1936 – 1 June 2018) was an Indian painter. His work was displayed in more than eighty exhibitions, among those sixteen were international painting exhibitions.

Career
Choudhury was born in 1936 in Bengal and took up painting as a budding artist from his childhood. Choudhury taught at the College of Art, New Delhi, during 1961–66. Choudhury referred to himself as an "aggressive painter" of "life full of misery" having to live through partition. He often expressed his protests against the dowry system, corruption and social inequalities.

Death
Choudhury died on 1 June 2018, at the age of 82.

References

1936 births
2018 deaths
Indian male painters
Artists from Kolkata
Indian portrait painters
20th-century Indian painters
People from Brahmanbaria district
Bengali male artists
20th-century Indian male artists